= Thomas Bourn =

Thomas Bourn (19 April 1771 – 20 August 1832) was an English schoolteacher and educational writer.

Bourn was born in Hackney, Middlesex (now part of London) on 19 April 1771. He was educated at a private school on Well Street in Hackney and was trained as a teacher by Reverend S Palmer.

In 1791, Bourn was hired as a geography teacher at a girl's private school run by the Quakers, with the assistance of his future father-in-law, William Butler. In 1796, he married Elizabeth Butler. The couple would eventually have eleven children.

In 1807, Bourn published A Concise Gazetteer of the most Remarkable Places in the World, a textbook that described many international historical events and the people associated with them: The Gazetteer contained 900 pages of maps, with the aim of making geography more accessible to children. Bourn's map associated people, places and events. The book was a success – a third edition was printed in 1822.

In 1829, Bourn edited William Butler's "A COLLECTION OF EASY ARITHMETICAL QUESTIONS, DESIGNED FOR THE USE OF YOUNG LADIES", as well as biographical compilations made by his friend, Stephen Jones. Bourn tried to provide practical examples of dates and figures, facts and statistics while making them appealing to young people. Bourn stated that "Young people require to be entertained as well as admonished."

Bourn died at his home in Mare Street, Hackney on 20 August 1832.
